"Victory" is a song by Kool & the Gang, released as the lead single off their seventh studio album Forever (1986).

Charts

Weekly charts

Year-end charts

References

1986 singles
1986 songs
Mercury Records singles
Kool & the Gang songs
Songs written by James "J.T." Taylor